Aithe... is a 2003 Indian Telugu-language thriller film written and directed by Chandra Sekhar Yeleti, and produced by Gangaraju Gunnam under his studio Just Yellow. It stars debutants Mohit Chadda, Shashank, Abhishek, Janardhan, and Sindhu Tolani, while Pavan Malhotra plays a pivotal role. The film deals with underworld criminal nexus and hijacking. The film was shot simultaneously in Hindi as 50 Lakh (2007). 
 
Aithe released on 11 April 2003. The film ran for a hundred days and was commercially successful. The film won the National Film Award for Best Feature Film in Telugu that year while Malhotra received Nandi Special Jury Award and Filmfare Best Villain Award (Telugu) for his performance. The film was remade in Tamil as Naam (2003) and in Malayalam as Wanted (2004).

Plot
Irfan Khan is a key mafia affiliate in Mumbai. Khan is on the wanted list of criminals in Hyderabad with a bounty of 50 lakh. Aiming to migrate to Dubai so that he can remotely control the operations in Mumbai, Khan devises a plan of getting four of his own men to hijack a domestic flight from Hyderabad to Kathmandu (destined for Mumbai) in which he is a passenger. The Home Minister of Maharashtra is also on the flight, and the four men are to release all the passengers and concentrate on the Home Minister. From Kathmandu, he plans to go to Dubai.

For the hijack, he organises a group of four intelligent men who are in dire need of money and who do not have a criminal record. The audience is made to believe in the beginning that the four central characters are these four men, but in fact they kidnap Khan before the flight takes off, aiming to get the prize money.

They hide Khan in a forest and call the Assistant Commissioner of Police, who is a double agent for the mafia. When the ACP does not yield (as he wants them to release Khan), one of the four, Kumar, makes a deal with the Mafia and obtains a bag with 2 crore. However, the bag in which the money is kept has a bomb in it. When Kumar tells the others that he has done this, they back out, and he joins with them, just in time.

Meanwhile, Khan's assistant, Musharraf, comes and takes Khan from the forest, but is stopped by IB agent Zaheer Khan, who has been following the four men and Musharraf throughout the movie.

Finally, the four friends come back to their house. They find a bag, which they had lost previously. With that, they find a note from Zaheer explaining everything. The bag also has, to their joy, their prize money.

Cast 
 Pavan Malhotra as Irfan Khan
 Veerendra Chowhan as Musharraf
 Mohit Chadda as Ramu
 Shashank as Kumar
 Janardhan as Shankar
  as Vivek
 Sindhu Tolani as Aditi
 Likhita as Kavitha
 Narsing Yadav as the Maharashtra home minister
 Sivaji Raja as Zaheer Khan
 CVL Narasimha Rao as Vivek's father
 Ashok Kumar as Madan Seth
 Harsha Vardhan as Chotu
 Sanjay Raichura as an ACP
 Lalith Sharma as the IB chief

Soundtrack
This album marked the debut of Kalyani Malik as a composer.

Reception 
Idlebrain.com reviewer Jeevi rated the film 4/5 and appreciated Yeleti's screenplay and direction."This story is a very authentic story without any surrealism or traces of inspiration in it. Screenplay of 'Aithe' is terrific. The debutant director Chandra Sekhar Eleti proves himself as the new generation director with a good technical knowledge," he stated.

Praveen Lance Fernandez of The Times of India reviewed the Hindi version 50 Lakh and gave it 2 stars. He wrote: "50 Lakh has nothing to offer mainly because of its shoe-string budget and bad performances. But from the plot and screenplay point of view, this one definitely scores over a lot of other recent films." Fernandez opined that had some of the performances been better, the film would have received better acclaim. "The south actors are clearly uncomfortable acting in a Hindi film," he added.

Awards
National Film Award for Best Feature Film in Telugu - 2004
Nandi Award for Best Story Writer - Chandra Sekhar Yeleti
Nandi Award for Best Audiographer - Madhusudhan Reddy
Nandi Special Jury Award - Pavan Malhotra
Filmfare Best Villain Award (Telugu) - Pavan Malhotra

Legacy 
Mohit Chadda and Pavan Malhotra starred in the thriller film The Deal, which was later renamed Aithe Enti after the success of this film. A reboot titled Aithe 2.0 released in 2018.

References

External links

2003 films
Indian crime thriller films
Films about criminals
Films about organised crime in India
2003 crime thriller films
Crime films based on actual events
Indian aviation films
Indian buddy films
Telugu films remade in other languages
Best Telugu Feature Film National Film Award winners
2000s Telugu-language films
2003 directorial debut films
Films directed by Chandra Sekhar Yeleti
2000s Hindi-language films
Indian multilingual films
2003 multilingual films